Hoseynabad (also Romanized as Ḩoseynābād) is a village in Khvormiz Rural District, in the Central District of Mehriz County, Yazd Province, Iran. At the 2006 census, its population was 237, in 59 families.

References 

Populated places in Mehriz County